The Bradford House in San Rafael, California, also known as Bradford Manor or as Bradford/Sharp House, was built in 1883.  It was listed on the National Register of Historic Places in 1980.

It was deemed "an exceptional example of Stick/Eastlake style." It is asymmetrical on all floors, with a veranda, some porches, and a steep and complex roof.

Descendants sold the home in 1916 and it was later divided into seven apartments.

References

		
National Register of Historic Places in Marin County, California
Stick-Eastlake architecture in California
Houses completed in 1883